The Family Upstairs is a 1926 American silent comedy film directed by John G. Blystone and starring Virginia Valli, Allan Simpson and J. Farrell MacDonald. It was based on a 1925 Broadway play, The Family Upstairs by Harry Delf.

Cast
 Virginia Valli as Louise Heller 
 Allan Simpson as Charles Grant 
 J. Farrell MacDonald as Joe Heller 
 Lillian Elliott as Emma Heller 
 Edward Peil Jr. as Willie Heller 
 Dot Farley as Mademoiselle Clarice 
 Julie Bishop as Annabelle Heller

See also
Harmony at Home (1930)
Stop, Look and Love (1939)

References

Bibliography
 Solomon, Aubrey. The Fox Film Corporation, 1915-1935: A History and Filmography. McFarland, 2011.

External links

1926 films
Silent American comedy films
American silent feature films
1920s English-language films
Fox Film films
Films directed by John G. Blystone
American black-and-white films
American films based on plays
1926 comedy films
1920s American films